Altenau is a town and a former municipality in the district of Goslar, in Lower Saxony, Germany. Since 1 January 2015 it is part of the town Clausthal-Zellerfeld.

It is situated in the middle of the Harz mountains, between Clausthal-Zellerfeld and the Brocken. It was part of the former Samtgemeinde ("collective municipality") Oberharz.

Geography 
The place is centrally located in the Upper Harz. Clausthal-Zellerfeld in the west is about ten kilometers, Goslar in the north about 15 km and Osterode am Harz in the southwest about 25 km away. To the east of the mountain town, twelve kilometers away, is the summit of the Brocken, which can be seen from many places in Altenau. The Oker flows through Altenau from south to north . Other streams flow into the Oker in the urban area and give Altenau a townscape with numerous valleys and hilltops. The area is heavily forested.

Districts 

The Torfhaus settlement about ten kilometers away belongs to Altenau . This is at the highest point of the B 4 at about 800 m above sea level and consists mainly of tourist businesse. Torfhaus is located in the Harz National Park.

Dammhaus 
It was built together with the Sperberhaier dam in the years 1732–1734, which closed a gap in the Upper Harz water shelf and bridged a shallow valley basin at a height of up to 16 m. Most of the original house has been preserved. The dam house was originally built for the miners who used it as a changing room and prayer house. Later it was used as an official residence for the trench keeper. In the further course the dam house, also known under the names "The foal house on the Sperberhaier" and "Sperberhaier Zechenhaus", served to supply forest workers and hikers.

Bastesiedlung 
The Bastesiedlung is a former lumberjack settlement between Bad Harzburg and Torfhaus in the Goslar district in the Harz region . It consists of about six residential buildings and had 18 residents in 2012.

The Baste forest workers' settlement is located north of the Torfhaus district on Bundesstraße 4 and comprises six timber-framed half-timbered houses that were built between 1949 and 1950. The buildings are under monument protection.

Gemkenthal 
Gemkenthal It is located on the B 498 directly at the Okertalsperre . The center of Altenau is about four kilometers south, while the Goslar district of Oker (Goslar) is ten kilometers north.

Gemkenthal consists of an inn. In addition, a sailing club.

History 
Altenau is an old mining town.1227 First mentioned in connection with mining. In 1298 there was a smelting company in the Tischlertal, which was handed over to the Goslarer Burchard Erhaftig by Burchard von Wildenstein. This hut stands in 1310 and is run by Albrecht Colven. 1412 Construction of a house "Altenah" by the Duke of Braunschweig. 1525 citizens of Altenau join forces to form a shooting society. 1532 mention of a mine in Altenau. 1540 Start of mining at the Gang treasury and other pits.1570 Start of mining at other pits
1580 First mentioned as Bergflecken, 20 houses, today Rotenberger Straße and Oberstraße crossing the treasury. 1584 Ironworks to the favor.1588 Documentary mention of a church
1594 mention of 35 houses. Duke Wolfgang gave the place the directionality
1603 Already 50 buildings are mentioned
1606 Construction of the first town hall
1610 Previous construction of a silver smelter
1617 Elevation of Altenau to town
1636 Altenau fell to Duke August zu Braunschweig-Lüneburg-Celle
1636 Altenau became a free mining town
1642 Construction of the steeple of the later St. Nikolai Church
1653 50 houses are counted
1665 Altenau finally came to Hanover after disputes over inheritance
1669 Construction of the St. Nikolai Church in place of the previous building, located between the two settlement centers of the city
1673 Construction of today's town hall
1691 New construction of the silver smelter
1698 930 inhabitants are counted
1711 Start of mining at the Silberlilie mine
December 18, 1729 flood of the Oker
1740 1400 inhabitants are counted
1746 closure of the pits on the Gerlachsbach
1748 Closure of the Güldener Hirsch mine
1762 Closure of the Green Treasury and Rose
1773 The silver lily pit is closed
1777 Johann Wolfgang von Goethe stays in Altenau
July 6, 1794 a large fire destroyed 29 houses in the Breite Strasse
1794 Construction of a fiscal ironworks below the silverworks
1813 1174 inhabitants and 165 houses are counted
1871 cessation of the ironworks
1901 Foundation of the volunteer fire brigade
1911 closure of the silver smelter
1914 Connection of Altenau to the Innerstetalbahn
1972 Administrative community within the joint municipality of Upper Harz
1972 Construction of the holiday park "Glockenberg"
1977 Closure of the Innerstetalbahn
2015 The mining town of Altenau is dissolved. On January 1, 2015, the Upper Harz municipality and its affiliated municipalities, Bergstadt Altenau, Bergstadt Clausthal-Zellerfeld, Bergstadt Wildemann and Schulenberg im Oberharz, were dissolved by state law and the new mining and university town of Clausthal-Zellerfeld was formed from the previously independent municipalities. Previously, 62% of the Altenauers who voted had spoken out against it in a public survey; however, according to a clause in the statutes, the result was not binding on the council. Since then, the previous mountain town of Altenau and the previous community of Schulenberg in the Upper Harz have formed the joint village of Altenau-Schulenberg in the Upper Harz with a local council.

Demographics

Sights 
Altenau is today a climatic health resort. The city is characterized by old miners' houses from the time when Altenau was a free mining town. The use of wood as a building material is typical of the region. In the town is the small wooden church of St. Nikolai , which was built in 1669. The architectural style of the houses is well adapted to the harsh winters and has an architectural style typical of the Harz region. To the south of the town center is the Schützenklippe, from which there is a panoramic view of the town.

In 2004 the largest herb park in Germany was opened in Altenau . Many thousands of tourists visit the year-round cultivated botanical garden, which shows a multitude of varieties . Other sights can be reached on foot via hiking trails. One comes across the Harz Witches to Dammgraben with the Dammhaus and the Polsterberg Pumphouse . Furthermore, hiking trails lead to the Kellwassertal at the Vorsperre to the Okertalsperre and to Torfhaus in the Harz National Park. The Heimatstube in Altenau offers an insight into the history of the Upper Harz. The exhibition there is dedicated to the presentation of the living conditions in the Upper Harz, which were strongly influenced by mining and the professions that depend on it - metallurgy, forestry, charcoal-burning and haulage. An important focus of the collection is the life's work of the artist Karl Reinecke-Altenau .

Regular events
Walpurgis Night (every April 30)
Hubertus Week (mid-September)
Torchlight walks
Altenauer Heimatfest (every five years)
Oktoberfest of the fire brigade
Overall Harz yodelling competition (took place in Clausthal-Zellerfeld until 2019)
The place is one of the eight places in which the tradition of the finch maneuver in the Harz, which has been recognized as an intangible world cultural heritage since 2014, is still cultivated.
Winter market
 The former railway station of Altenau, a wooden building dating from 1914

Personals 
Wilhelm Knop
Adolf Knop
Hermine Hartleben

Politics

Town council 
2006 local elections:
 SPD: 7 seats (54.16%)
 CDU: 6 seats (45.84%)

Former Mayors
1856 Tolle (first mayor)
1878 Rössing
1879 Jordan
1890 Hodann
1894 Aderhold
1896 king
1904 Schmidt
1908 (February 17) Dr. Angel
1913 angel
1915 custom
1918 Unoccupied
1919 Cooper
1931 Breyel
1946-1948 Tosch
1948-1953 Heins
1950 Heins (Mayor), Breyel (City Manager)
1953–1956 squire
1956–1971 forester
1971–1976 Biegholdt
1976-1981 Loikkasek
1981–1986 Biegholdt
1986–1991 Schierloh
1991-2005 Gerhard Lindemann
since 2005 Alexander Ehrenberg

Religion
The Protestant majority of the population is organized in the parish of St. Nikolai, the center of which is the St. Nikolai Church, built in 1669 in the center of Altenau. The parish today belongs to the Clausthal-Zellerfeld parish, which also includes the St. Petrus Chapel in Schulenberg .

The Catholic St. Oliver Church from 1979 is located on the Glockenberg. Today the church belongs to the parish of Clausthal-Zellerfeld.

Economy and Infrastructure 
The Altenauer brewery, formerly Paul Kolberg GmbH & Co. KG , was taken over by the Klostergutsbrauerei Wöltingerode GmbH with effect from August 1, 2012 . Its sole shareholder is the General Hanover Monastery Fund, represented by the Hanover Monastery Chamber . The brewery currently has an annual output of around 8,000 hectoliters of beer, which is brewed in eight variants, and 3,000 hectoliters of non-alcoholic beverages.

There are also numerous companies that can be attributed to tourism, such as hotels, guest houses, holiday apartments, restaurants and the corresponding retail trade.

In Altenau you will find a Police and Firestation, a Doctors Office, Drugstore.

Traffic 
Altenau is on the federal road 498, which leads from Goslar to Osterode . Via an approximately eight kilometer long and up to nine percent steep country road, the "Steile Wand", you can access the B 4 in Torfhaus .

Buses of the regional bus Braunschweig (RBB) and the HarzBus drive to Goslar, Clausthal-Zellerfeld and Sankt Andreasberg . Altenau is also the end point of a long-distance bus line from Berlin, the so-called BEX bus line.

Until 1976, Altenau station was the end of the Innerstetalbahn, the other end of which was in Langelsheim . In 1977 a last train ran the route. This route was closed for cost reasons. The tracks have been completely removed, the route now serves as a cycle path and cross-country ski run.

References

External links 

 Samtgemeinde Oberharz 
 

Towns in Lower Saxony
Goslar (district)
Towns in the Harz